Holly Victoria Hagan-Blyth is an English television personality, model and singer from Thornaby-on-Tees. She starred on and is best known from the MTV series Geordie Shore.

Early life
Hagan was born in the town of Thornaby-on-Tees, in Northeast England, which is part of North Yorkshire county. For three years when Hagan was a small child, she and her parents lived in a council house in Grove Hill, a housing estate in Middlesbrough. She was enrolled by her mother in a private nursery. When Hagan was three years old, the council house in which she lived was burgled during the night. Sometime later, her mother witnessed three people inside a burning vehicle, and made plans to move elsewhere the following day. Ultimately, the family moved to Thornaby-on-Tees, and at the age of four, Hagan was enrolled at St Joseph's RC primary.

Before Geordie Shore, Hagan worked for HM Revenue and Customs and in sales at a Santander call centre, in hopes of launching a career as a glamour model. After applying for, and securing a place on the show she eventually quit her job.

Modelling
Hagan has featured in many men's magazines including Nuts with a photoshoot with fellow castmate Vicky Pattison as well as by herself on several occasions. She has appeared on the cover of both the UK's FHM and Loaded. In July 2012 she posed topless for a photoshoot with the magazine.

Career

Hagan made her first appearance on MTV hit reality TV show Geordie Shore on the first episode of Series one making her one of the original cast members, in her time on the show she embarked on relationships with other cast members such as James Tindale, Scott Timlin and Kyle Christie. After making 111 appearances Hagan left the show in the Series 13 finale which aired on 20, December 2016.

In 2014, Hagan released a remixed cover version of "Milkshake". In April 2016, Hagan and her ex-boyfriend, co star Kyle Christie starred in MTV's new show Car Crash Couples. Hagan also released an autobiography titled "Holly Hagan: Not quite a Geordie book."

In October 2016, Hagan appeared on Celebrity Storage Hunters UK as a buyer in Season 1. In January 2017, Hagan appeared on Celebrity 100% Hotter. In early 2018, Hagan appeared on E4’s spin off series Five Star Hotel, alongside Joey Essex, Lydia Bright and Spencer Matthews. 

Holly returned to Geordie Shore mid-way through series 17 in Australia following a 2 year break She did the same in series 18 and became a part time cast member for series 19 and made various appearances on nights out throughout the series however did not live in the house. Following her short return, Holly made the decision not to return for anymore series. In 2019, Hagan began starring in the MTV series Geordie OGs, a spinoff series of Geordie Shore until its cancellation in 2021. In October 2022 Hagan returned for the 23rd series of Geordie Shore which brought back all the original cast members excluding Vicky Pattison and Gary Beadle who chose not to return.

Personal life
In June 2019, Hagan announced her engagement to footballer boyfriend Jacob Blyth. They were married in Ibiza on 6 June 2022, and in January 2023 announced they were expecting their first child.

Filmography

Guest appearances 
 Warsaw Shore (19 January 2014)
 Drunk History (23 February 2016)
 Just Tattoo of Us (10 April 2017, 8 May 2017)
 The Charlotte Show (2 July 2019)

Discography
2012: "VIP, Who Cares!"
2014: "Milkshake"

References

External links

1992 births
Living people
Geordie Shore
People from Thornaby-on-Tees
Television personalities from Yorkshire
Association footballers' wives and girlfriends